The Lhasa Apso is a non-sporting dog breed originating in Tibet. It has traditionally been used as an interior sentinel.

Etymology 

Lhasa is the capital city of Tibet, and apso is a word from the Tibetan language. There is some debate over the exact origin of the name; some claim that the word "apso" is an anglicized form of the Tibetan word for goatee ("ag-tshom", ཨག་ཚོམ་) or perhaps "ra-pho" (ར་ཕོ་) meaning "billy goat". It may also be a compound noun meaning "bark-guard" (lit. "ap" [ཨཔ], to bark, and "so" [སོ་], to guard).

History 

The Lhasa Apso originated in Tibet. In the early twentieth century some Tibetan dogs were brought to the United Kingdom by military men returning from the Indian subcontinent. These were of mixed types, similar either to what would become the Lhasa Apso or to what would become the Tibetan Terrier; they were collectively known as "Lhasa Terrier".

The original American pair of Lhasas was a gift from Thubten Gyatso, 13th Dalai Lama to C. Suydam Cutting, arriving in the United States in 1933. Mr. Cutting had traveled to Tibet and met the Dalai Lama. At the time, there was only one Lhasa Apso registered in England. The American Kennel Club officially accepted the breed in 1935 in the Terrier Group, and in 1959 transferred the breed to the Non-Sporting Group. In the UK, they are placed in the Utility Group.

The breed was definitively accepted by the Fédération Cynologique Internationale in 1960.

Characteristics 

The coat may be black, red, dark grizzle, golden, honey, parti-colour, sandy, slate-coloured, smoke-coloured or white. It is thick and heavy, with a hard straight outer coat and a medium under-coat. The eyes are dark and the nose is black, and the ears are pendant. The tail is curved, sometimes with a kink at the tip, and should be carried over the back.

It ranks 68th (out of 138) in Stanley Coren's The Intelligence of Dogs, having fair working-obedience intelligence. The Lhasa Apso is a long-lived breed, with many living in good health into their early 20s.

A 2004 Kennel Club survey puts the median lifespan of the breed at 14 years 4 months. UK vet clinic data puts the median at 13.0 years.

References 

Companion dogs
Dog breeds originating in Tibet
FCI breeds